The Mayak Production Association (from  'lighthouse') is one of the largest nuclear facilities in the Russian Federation, housing a reprocessing plant. The closest settlements are Ozyorsk to the northwest and Novogornyi to the south.

Lavrentiy Beria led the Soviet atomic bomb project. He directed the construction of the Mayak Plutonium plant in the Southern Urals between 1945 and 1948, in a great hurry and secrecy as part of the Soviet Union's atomic bomb project. Over 40,000 Gulag prisoners and POWs built the factory and the closed nuclear city of Ozersk, called at the time by its classified postal code "Forty". Five (today closed) nuclear reactors were built to produce plutonium which was refined and machined for weapons. Later the plant came to specialise in reprocessing spent nuclear fuel from nuclear reactors and plutonium from decommissioned weapons.

Once production began, engineers quickly ran out of underground space to store high-level radioactive waste. Rather than cease production of plutonium until new underground waste storage tanks could be built, between 1949 and 1951, Soviet managers dumped  of toxic chemicals, including 3.2 million curies of high-level radioactive waste into the Techa River, a slow-moving hydraulic system that bogs down in swamps and lakes.

As many as 40 villages, with a combined population of about 28,000, lined the river at the time. For 24 of them, the Techa was a major source of water; 23 of them were eventually evacuated. In the 45 years afterwards, about half a million people in the region have been irradiated in one or more of the incidents, exposing them to up to 20 times the radiation suffered by the Chernobyl disaster victims outside of the plant itself.

Investigators in 1951 found communities along the river highly contaminated. On discovery, soldiers immediately evacuated the first downriver village of Metlino, population 1,200, where radiation levels measured 3.5–5 rads/hr (35–50 mGy/hr or 10–14 μGy/s). At that rate, people would get the equivalent of a lifetime exposure to radiation in less than a week. During the following decade, ten additional communities were resettled from the river, but the largest community, Muslumovo, remained. Researchers investigated residents of Muslumovo annually in what has become a four-generation living experiment of people living among chronic, low doses of radioactivity. Blood samples showed its villagers took in caesium-137, ruthenium-106, strontium-90, and iodine-131, internally and externally. These isotopes had deposited in organs, flesh and bone marrow. Villagers complained of various illnesses and symptoms—chronic fatigue, sleep and fertility problems, weight loss, and increased hypertension. The frequency of congenital disabilities and complications at birth was three times greater than normal. In 1953, doctors examined 587 of 28,000 exposed people and found that 200 had clear cases of radiation poisoning.

In 1957 Mayak was the site of the Kyshtym disaster, which at the time was the worst nuclear accident in history. During this catastrophe, a poorly maintained storage tank exploded, releasing 20 million curies (740 PBq) in the form of 50–100 tons of high-level radioactive waste.

The Soviet government kept this accident secret for about 30 years. It is rated at 6 on the seven-level INES scale. It is third in severity, surpassed only by Chernobyl in Ukraine and Fukushima in Japan.

Mayak is still active , and it serves as a reprocessing site for spent nuclear fuel. Today the plant makes tritium and radioisotopes, not plutonium. In recent years, proposals that the plant reprocess waste from foreign nuclear reactors have given rise to controversy.

An incompletely reported accident appears to have occurred in September 2017; see Airborne radioactivity increase in Europe in autumn 2017.

Location

The nuclear complex is 150 km south of Ekaterinburg, between the towns of Kasli and Tatysh, and 100 km northwest of Chelyabinsk. The closest city, Ozyorsk, is the central administrative territorial district. As part of the Russian (formerly Soviet) nuclear weapons program, Mayak was formerly known as Chelyabinsk-40 and later as Chelyabinsk-65, referring to the postal codes of the site.

Design and structure
The site borders Ozyorsk, in which a majority of the staff of Mayak live. Mayak itself was not shown on Soviet public maps. The location of the site together with the plant city was chosen to minimise the effects that harmful emissions could potentially have on populated areas. Mayak is surrounded by a ~ exclusion zone. Nearby is the site of the South Urals nuclear power plant.

Notes

History
Built in total secrecy between 1945 and 1948, the Mayak plant was the first reactor used to create plutonium for the Soviet atomic bomb project. In accordance with Stalinist procedure and supervised by NKVD Chief Lavrenti Beria, it was the utmost priority to produce enough weapons-grade material to match the U.S. nuclear superiority following the atomic bombings of Hiroshima and Nagasaki. Little to no consideration was paid to worker safety or responsible disposal of waste materials, and the reactors were all optimised for plutonium production, producing many tons of contaminated materials and utilising primitive open-cycle cooling systems which directly contaminated the thousands of gallons of cooling water the reactors used every day.

Lake Kyzyltash was the largest natural lake capable of providing cooling water to the reactors; it was rapidly contaminated via the open-cycle system. The closer Lake Karachay, too small to provide sufficient cooling water, was used as a dumping ground for large quantities of high-level radioactive waste too "hot" to store in the facility's underground storage vats. The original plan was to use the lake to store highly radioactive material until it could be returned to the Mayak facility's underground concrete storage vats, but this proved impossible due to the lethal levels of radioactivity (see Pollution of Lake Karachay). The lake was used for this purpose until the Kyshtym Disaster in 1957, in which the underground vats exploded due to a faulty cooling system. This incident caused widespread contamination of the entire Mayak area (as well as a large swath of territory to the northeast). This led to greater caution among the administration, fearing international attention, and caused the dumping grounds to be spread out over a variety of areas (including several lakes and the Techa River, along which many villages lay).

Kyshtym disaster

Working conditions at Mayak resulted in severe health hazards and many accidents. The most notable accident occurred on 29 September 1957, when the failure of the cooling system for a tank storing tens of thousands of tons of dissolved nuclear waste resulted in a chemical (non-nuclear) explosion having an energy estimated at 75 tons of TNT (310 gigajoules).  This released 740 PBq (20 MCi) of fission products, of which 74 PBq (2 MCi) drifted off the site, creating a contaminated region of  called the East Urals Radioactive trace. Subsequently, an estimated 49 to 55 people died of radiation-induced cancer, 66 were diagnosed with chronic radiation syndrome, 10,000 people were evacuated from their homes, and 470,000 people were exposed to radiation.

The Soviet Union did not release news of the accident and denied it happened for nearly 30 years. Residents of Chelyabinsk district in the Southern Urals reported observing "polar-lights" in the sky near the plant, and American aerial spy photos had documented the destruction caused by the disaster by 1960. This nuclear accident, the Soviet Union's worst before the Chernobyl disaster, is categorised as a Level 6 "Serious Accident" on the 0–7 International Nuclear Events Scale.

When Zhores Medvedev exposed the disaster in a 1976 article in New Scientist, some exaggerated claims circulated in the absence of any verifiable information from the Soviet Union. People "grew hysterical with fear with the incidence of unknown 'mysterious' diseases breaking out. Victims were seen with skin 'sloughing off' their faces, hands and other exposed parts of their bodies." As Zhores wrote, "Hundreds of square miles were left barren and unusable for decades and maybe centuries. Hundreds of people died, thousands were injured and surrounding areas were evacuated." Professor Leo Tumerman, former head of the Biophysics Laboratory at the Institute of Molecular Biology in Moscow, disclosed what he knew of the accident around the same time. Russian documents gradually declassified from 1989 onward show the true events were less severe than rumoured.

According to Gyorgy, who invoked the Freedom of Information Act to open up the relevant Central Intelligence Agency (CIA) files, the CIA knew of the 1957 Mayak accident, but kept it secret to prevent adverse consequences for the fledgling US nuclear industry. "Ralph Nader surmised that the information had not been released because of the reluctance of the CIA to highlight a nuclear accident in the USSR, that could cause concern among people living near nuclear facilities in the USA." Only in 1992, shortly after the fall of the USSR, did the Russians officially acknowledge the accident.

1968 Criticality Incident

In December 1968, the facility was experimenting with plutonium purification techniques. Two operators were using an "unfavourable geometry vessel in an improvised and unapproved operation as a temporary vessel for storing plutonium organic solution." "Unfavourable geometry" means that the vessel was too compact, reducing the amount of plutonium needed to achieve a critical mass to less than the amount present. After most of the solution had been poured out, there was a flash of light and heat. After the complex had been evacuated, the shift supervisor and radiation control supervisor re-entered the building. The shift supervisor then entered the room of the incident, caused another, larger nuclear reaction and irradiated himself with a deadly dose of radiation.

2017 radiation release

Abnormally high levels of radiation were reported in the area of the facility in November 2017. Simultaneously, traces of radioactive manmade isotope Ruthenium-106 spread across Europe in September and October. Such a release had not been seen on a continental scale since the Chernobyl accident. In January 2018, the French Institute of Radioprotection and Nuclear Security (IRSN) reported that the source of the contamination is located in the Volga – Southern Ural region between 25 and 28 September for a duration of less than 24 hours. The report excludes the possibility of an accidental release from a nuclear reactor, stating that it seems related with irradiated fuels processing or the production of sources from fission products solution. It may point to Mayak's aborted attempt to manufacture a capsule of highly radioactive component cerium-144, for the SOX project in Italy. Both the Russian government and Rosatom denied at the time that another accidental leak took place at Mayak. The release of a cloud of ruthenium-106 is similar to the B205 reprocessing accident in Britain in 1973.

Environmental impact
In the early years of its operation, the Mayak plant directly discharged high-level nuclear waste into several small lakes near the plant, and into the Techa River, whose waters ultimately flow into the Ob River. Mayak continues to dump low-level radioactive waste directly into the Techa River today. Medium level waste is discharged into the Karachay Lake. The tritium concentration alone in the river near the village of Muslyumovo exceeds the permissible limit by 30 times.

Rosatom, a state-owned nuclear operations corporation, began to resettle residents of Muslyumovo in 2006. However, only half of the residents of the village were moved.  People continue to live in the immediate area of the plant, including Ozersk and other downstream areas. Residents report no problems with their health and the health of Mayak plant workers. However, these claims lack verification, and many who worked at the plant in 1950s and 1960s subsequently died from the effects of radiation. The administration of the Mayak plant has been repeatedly criticized in recent years by Greenpeace and other environmental advocates for environmentally unsound practices.

List of accidents

The Mayak plant is associated with two other major nuclear accidents. The first occurred as a result of heavy rains causing Lake Karachay, a dried-up radioactively polluted lake (used as a dumping basin for Mayak's radioactive waste since 1951), to release radioactive material into surrounding waters. The second occurred in 1967 when wind spread dust from the bottom of Lake Karachay over parts of Ozersk; over 400,000 people were irradiated..

Major accidents at Mayak, 1953–1998
Source:
 15 March 1953 – Criticality accident. Contamination of plant personnel occurred.
 13 October 1955 – Rupture of process equipment and the destruction of a process building.
 21 April 1957 – Criticality accident. One operator died from receiving over 3000 rad. Five others received doses of 300 to 1,000 rem and temporarily became sick with radiation poisoning.
 29 September 1957 – Kyshtym disaster.
 2 January 1958 – Criticality accident in SCR plant. Plant workers conducted experiments to determine the critical mass of enriched uranium in a cylindrical container with different concentrations of uranium in solution. Personnel received doses from 7600 to 13,000 rem, resulting in three deaths and one case of blindness caused by radiation sickness.   
 12 May 1960 – Criticality accident. Five people were contaminated.
 26 February 1962 – Destruction of equipment. An explosion occurred in the absorption column.
 9 July 1962 – Criticality accident.
 16 December 1965 – Criticality accident. Seventeen individuals received exposure to small amounts of radiation over a period of 14 hours.
 10 December 1968 – Criticality accident. Plutonium solution was poured into a cylindrical container with dangerous geometry. One person died, another took a high dose of radiation and radiation sickness, after which he had both legs and his right arm amputated.
 11 February 1976 – Unsafe actions of staff development at the radiochemical plant caused an autocatalytic reaction of concentrated nitric acid and organic liquid complex composition. The device exploded, contaminating the repair zone and areas around the plant. The incident merited an International Nuclear Event Scale rating of 3.
 10 February 1984 – Explosion.  
 16 November 1990 – Explosion. Two people received burns and one was killed.
 17 July 1993 –  Accident at radioisotope plant, resulting in the destruction of the absorption column and release into the environment of a small amount of α-aerosols. Radiation emission was localised at the manufacturing facility of the shop.
Radioactive trace was localised, contaminated soil removed.
 27 December 1993 – Incident at radioisotope plant where the replacement of a filter resulted in the release into the atmosphere of radioactive aerosols. Emissions were on the α-activity of 0.033 Ci, and β-activity of 0.36 mCi.
 4 February 1994 – Recorded increased release of radioactive aerosols: the β-activity of 2-day levels of Cs-137 subsistence levels, the total activity of 7.15 mCi.
 30 March 1994 – Recorded excess daily release of Cs-137 in 3, β-activity – 1,7, α-activity – by 1.9 times. In May 1994 the ventilation system of the building of the plant spewed activity 10.4 mCi β-aerosols. Emission of Cs-137 was 83% of the control level.
 7 July 1994 – The control plant detected a radioactive spot area of several square decimetres. Exposure dose was 500 millirems per second. The spot was formed by leaking sewage.
 31 August 1994 – Registered an increased release of radionuclides to the atmospheric pipe building reprocessing plant (238.8 mCi, with the share of Cs-137 was 4.36% of the annual emission limit of this radionuclide). The reason for the release of radionuclides was depressurisation of VVER-440 fuel elements during the operation segments idle all SFA (spent fuel assemblies) as a result of an uncontrollable arc.
 24 March 1995 –  Recorded excess of 19% of normal loading apparatus plutonium, which can be regarded as a dangerous nuclear incident.
 15 September 1995 – High-level liquid radioactive waste (LRW) was found in flow of cooling water. Operation of a furnace into the regulatory regime has been discontinued.
 21 December 1995 – Cutting of a thermometric channel exposed four workers (1.69, 0.59, 0.45, 0.34 rem) when operators violated process procedures.
 24 July 1995 –  Cs-137 aerosols released, the value of which amounted to 0.27% of the annual value of MPE for the enterprise. 
 14 September 1995 – Replacement covers and lubrication step manipulators registered a sharp increase in airborne α-nuclides.
 22 October 1996 – Depressurisation occurred in a coil while channeling cooling water from one storage tanks of high-level waste. The result was contaminated pipe cooling system repositories. As a result of this incident, 10 people were exposed to radiation dose of 2.23 to 48 milli-Sieverts.
 20 November 1996 – A chemical-metallurgical plant in the works on the electrical exhaust fan caused aerosol release of radionuclides into the atmosphere, which made up 10% of the allowed annual emissions of the plant.
 27 August 1997 – In building RT-1 in one of the rooms was found to be contaminated floor area of 1 to 2 m2, the dose rate of gamma radiation from the spot was between 40 and 200 mR / s.
 6 October 1997 – Recorded increasing radioactivity in the assembly building, the RT-1. Measurement of the exposure dose indicated up to 300 mR / s.
 23 September 1998 – While increasing power output of reactor P-2 ("Lyudmila") after engaging automatic protection allowable power level was exceeded by 10%. As a result, the three channels of the fuel rod seal failed, resulting in the contamination of equipment and pipelines of the first circuit.

Notes

More recent major accidents
 In 2003, the plant's operating licence was revoked temporarily due to liquid radioactive waste handling procedures resulting in waste being disposed into open water.
 In June 2007, an accident involving a radioactive pulp occurred over a two-day period.
 In October 2007, a valve failure during transport of a radioactive liquid resulted in spilling of a radioactive material.
 In 2008, a repair worker was injured during a "pneumatic" incident, involving a quantity of alpha emitter release. The worker's hand was injured and the wound contaminated. The worker's finger was amputated in an attempt to minimize spread of alpha-particle emitters throughout his body and subsequent radiological consequences.
In September 2017, possible association with the airborne radioactivity increase in Europe in autumn 2017. Russia confirms 'extremely high' readings of radioactive pollution in Argayash, a village in the Chelyabinsk region of the southern Urals. Argayash is located 10 miles south of the Mayak plant. In January 2018, the French Institute of Radioprotection and Nuclear Security (IRSN) reported that Mayak could be the cause of the contamination. The radioactivity was due to Ru-106 indicating release from a late stage in the reprocessing (i.e. after the Ru-106 had been separated from other isotopes).

See also
City 40
List of civilian nuclear accidents
List of military nuclear accidents
Nuclear and radiation accidents and incidents
Ozyorsk, Chelyabinsk Oblast
Radioactive contamination
Radioactive waste
Reprocessed uranium
Techa River, the radioactive river

References

External links

 

Nuclear reprocessing sites
Nuclear technology companies of Russia
Nuclear waste companies
Buildings and structures in Chelyabinsk Oblast
Ural Mountains
Nuclear weapons programme of Russia
Federal State Unitary Enterprises of Russia
Companies based in Chelyabinsk Oblast
Rosatom
Ministry of Medium Machine Building
1948 establishments in Russia
Waste companies established in 1948